The discography of British rapper Wretch 32 consists of four studio albums, six mixtapes, fourteen singles (including five as a featured artist) and nineteen music videos.

Having released his debut studio album—Wretchrospective—in October 2008 to limited commercial success, Wretch 32 succeeded the release with a second album; Black and White. The lead single, "Traktor", was released in January 2011; and saw the artist make his first appearance on the UK chart when it debuted at number five. It was succeeded by the release of "Unorthodox"—featuring British musician Example—in April. The track, which sampled The Stone Roses' 1989 hit "Fools Gold" debuted at number two in the UK; also topping the R&B chart and independent releases chart. A third single, "Don't Go" featuring Josh Kumra, preceded the album's release; debuting at number-one in the UK; becoming the rapper's first number-one single. Upon release in August 2011, Black and White debuted at number four on the UK Albums Chart. A further two singles were taken from the album: "Forgiveness" featuring Etta Bond (December 2011) and "Hush Little Baby" featuring Ed Sheeran (March 2012); peaking at number forty-nine and number thirty-five respectively.

Wretch 32 has also attained chart success as a featured artist, the first example of which is on the number ninety-two peaking "Hangover" by Starboy Nathan (May 2011). In November 2011, Wretch featured as one of many artists on the Children in Need 2011 charity single "Teardrop"; which peaked at number twenty-four in the United Kingdom. In 2012, Wretch featured on both "Go In, Go Hard" by Angel and "Off With Their Heads" by Devlin; the former of which peaked at number forty-one in the UK.

Albums

Studio albums

Mixtapes

Singles

As lead artist

As featured artist

Promotional singles

Guest appearances

Remixes

Music videos

References

Discographies of British artists
Hip hop discographies